The ruddy duck (Oxyura jamaicensis) is a duck from North America and one of the stiff-tailed ducks. The genus name is derived from Ancient Greek oxus, "sharp", and oura, "tail", and jamaicensis is "from Jamaica".

Taxonomy
The ruddy duck was formally described in 1789 by the German naturalist Johann Friedrich Gmelin in his revised and expanded edition of Carl Linnaeus's Systema Naturae. He placed it with the other ducks, geese and swans in the genus Anas and coined the binomial name Anas jamaicensis. Gmelin based his description on the "Jamaica shoveler" that had been described in 1785 by the English ornithologist John Latham from a specimen that he had received from Jamaica. The ruddy duck is now placed with five other species in the genus Oxyura that was introduced in 1828 by the French naturalist Charles Lucien Bonaparte. The genus name is derived from Ancient Greek oxus, meaning "sharp", and oura meaning "tail". The specific epithet jamaicensis means "from Jamaica". The Andean duck was formerly considered to be conspecific with the ruddy duck but with the two species split, the ruddy duck is monotypic: no subspecies are recognised.

Description

These are small, compact ducks with stout, scoop-shaped bills, and long, stiff tails they often hold cocked upward. They have slightly peaked heads and fairly short, thick necks. Male ruddy ducks have blackish caps that contrast with bright white cheeks. In summer, they have rich chestnut bodies with bright blue bills. In winter, they are dull gray-brown above and paler below with dull gray bills. Females and first-year males are brownish, somewhat like winter males but with a blurry stripe across the pale cheek patch. In flight, ruddy ducks show solidly dark tops of the wings.

Breeding and habits
Their breeding habitat is marshy lakes and ponds. They nest in dense marsh vegetation near water. The female builds the nest out of grass, locating it in tall vegetation to hide it from predators. A typical brood contains 5 to 15 ducklings. Pairs form each year.

They are migratory and winter in coastal bays and unfrozen lakes and ponds.

These birds dive and swim underwater. They mainly eat seeds and roots of aquatic plants, aquatic insects and crustaceans.

Invasive species
Ruddy ducks were imported into the UK in 1948 by conservationist Sir Peter Scott. As a result of escapes from wildfowl collections in the late 1950s, they became established in Great Britain, from where they spread into Europe. By the year 2000, the population had increased to around 6,000 individuals. This duck's aggressive courting behavior and willingness to interbreed with the endangered native white-headed duck (Oxyura leucocephala), of southern Europe, caused concern amongst Spanish conservationists. Due to this, a controversial scheme to extirpate the ruddy duck as a British breeding species started; there have also been culling attempts in other European countries. By early 2014, the cull had reduced the British population to about 20–100, down from a peak of about 5500 in 2000.

In Europe, the Ruddy duck is included since 2016 in the list of Invasive Alien Species of Union concern (the Union list). This implies that this species cannot be imported, bred, transported, commercialized, or intentionally released into the environment in the whole of the European Union.

References

External links
 
 
 Ruddy Duck Species Account – Cornell Lab of Ornithology
 Ruddy Duck - Oxyura jamaicensis - USGS Patuxent Bird Identification InfoCenter
 The Royal Society for the Protection of Birds (in favor of the cull)
 Animal Aid (against the cull)
 Ruddy Duck Species Account at Massachusetts Breeding Bird Atlas
 
 

ruddy duck
ruddy duck
Birds of North America
Birds of Central America
Birds of the Caribbean
Birds of the Dominican Republic
Birds of Haiti
ruddy duck
ruddy duck